Wilca (possibly from Aymara and Quechua) is an archaeological site in Peru. It is situated in the Amazonas Region, Utcubamba Province, in the east of the Cajaruro District, near the border with the Bongara Province.

References 

Archaeological sites in Peru
Archaeological sites in Amazonas Region